James Day may refer to:

 James Day (poet), English poet
 James Milford Day (1815–1894), Texas military figure
 James Plummer Day (1831–1905), American farmer, agricultural science and education advocate, and Dakota territorial politician
 James G. Day (1835–1898), justice of the Iowa Supreme Court
 James Roscoe Day (1845–1923), American minister and academic administrator
 James Day (cricketer) (1850–1895), English cricketer
 James Wentworth Day (1899–1983), British writer and broadcaster
 J. Edward Day (1914–1996), American businessman and political office-holder
 James Day (journalist) (1918–2008), American public television executive and performer
 James L. Day (1925–1998), U.S. Marine Corps general
 Jim Day (James E. Day, born 1946), Canadian equestrian
 Jim Day (host) (born 1965), American television sports broadcaster
 James Buddy Day, Canadian director, writer and producer
 James M. Day, American game designer

See also
 Jamie Day (disambiguation)
 St James Day